Pacuarito is a district of the Siquirres canton, in the Limón province of Costa Rica.

History 
Pacuarito was created on 19 September 1911 by Ley 11.

Geography 
Pacuarito has an area of  km² and an elevation of  metres.

Locations
 Villages (Poblados): Alto Mirador, Altos de Pacuarito, Buenos Aires, Cimarrones, Culpeper, Cultivez, Freehold, Galicia, Isla Nueva, Leona, Madre de Dios, Manila, Monteverde, Perla, Perlita, Río Hondo, San Carlos, San Rafael, Santa Rosa, Ten Switch, Trinidad, Waldeck

Demographics 

For the 2011 census, Pacuarito had a population of  inhabitants.

Transportation

Road transportation 
The district is covered by the following road routes:
 National Route 32
 National Route 804

References 

Districts of Limón Province
Populated places in Limón Province